The National Polytechnic School or École Nationale Polytechnique (ENP) is an engineering school founded in 1925. The architectural diversity of the buildings reflects the different extensions and enlargements of the areas of expertise, teachings and research.
A common misconception is to call the school the National Polytechnic School of Algiers while its official name is the National Polytechnic School abbreviated in French as ENP.

The school was created in 1925 under the name of "Institut industriel d'Algérie", the aim of this establishment was to train senior technicians for large public services and industrial and public works companies. After the Second World War a training of aeronautical technicians in North Africa was created the ENPA, National Professional School of the Air by General Martin whose alumni continue to maintain a historical site and memory. Closed because of the Second World War, the school was reopened under the name École nationale d'ingénieurs d'Algérie. In 1962, the ENP hosted the first meetings of the provisional government of Algeria. After independence, it was transformed into the National Polytechnic School by the ministerial decree of June 25, 1963.

Admission & Academic programs 

The National Polytechnic School offers a preparatory class in science and technology (CPST-ENP), accessible directly after the baccalaureate, an average of more than 17.00/20 is required for the branches Mathematics & experimental science and 18.00/20 for the technical branch Mathematics.

Admission to the ENP's engineering program is through a selective competitive examination called the Concours National Commun d'admission aux grandes écoles d'ingénieurs, among students in science and technology preparatory classes. Polytechnique finally receives a little less than 200 students each year, it is the most selective engineering school in Algeria.

The engineering courses offered by the National Polytechnic School of Algiers are provided in order to produce Engineers and Researchers able to imagine, design and develop innovative ideas, products, processes as well as building the future as well as the diversity of the Algerian economy.

The specialties of engineers 
 Automation
 Chemical Engineering
 Civil Engineering
 Electrical Engineering
 Electronics
 Industrial Engineering
 Environmental Engineering
 Hydraulics
 Mechanical Engineering
 QHSE - GRI (Quality, Health, Safety, Environment - Industrial Risk Management) Engineering
 Mining Engineering
 Material Engineering
 Data Science and Artificial Intelligence (which has been added as a new specialty in 2020)

The engineering courses are based on successful research centers and experienced teaching teams. The school also provides many opportunities for continuing the training by a specialisation and many Doctorate Masters.

Famous Alumni 

 Abdelaziz Ouabdesselam, founder of the school.
 Mohand Aoudjehane, former professor and director of the school.
 Mohand Ait-ali, former director of the school and professor emeritus
 Pr Chems Eddine Chitour, professor of thermodynamics and former director of the school.
 Khaled Mounir Berrah, former director of the school.
 Mohamed Oujaout, professor of mathematics at the school, and Minister of National Education.
 Azzedine Oussedik, director general of the Algerian Space Agency.
 Saïd Mekbel, journalist and columnist who was a former teacher at the school.
 Youcef Yousfi, Minister of Energy and Mines and former professor at the school.
 Hadji Baba Ammi, Minister Delegate of Budget and Prospective and former President of the Board of Directors of the Algerian Bank of Foreign Trade.
 Noureddine Moussa, Minister of Housing and Urban Development.
 Lakhdar Rakhroukh, Algerian Minister of Public Works, Hydraulics and Basic Infrastructure.
 Boualem Sansal, writer and essayist.
 Salah Belaadi, former DG of the National Agency for the Development of University Research
 Rachid Deriche, researcher in computer science.
 Karim Oumnia, CEO Glagla Shoes.
 Saïd Bouteflika, brother and advisor to the president.
 Noureddine Cherouati, former CEO of Sonatrach.
 Mohamed Meziane, former CEO of Sonatrach.
 Amine Mazouzi, former CEO of Sonatrach.
 Abdelmoumen Ould Kaddour, former CEO of Sonatrach.
 Mustapha Achaïbou, former CEO of the telephone operator Mobilis.
 Zidane Merah, director general of the public establishment Algérienne des eaux (ADE).

References

External links 
 Students forum (needs registration)

Buildings and structures in Algiers
Universities and colleges in Algeria
1925 establishments in Algeria
Education in Algiers